A regional election took place in Alsace on March 15, 1998, along with all other regions.

1998
1998 elections in France